Armada Holdings/Armada Group as one of the leading United Arab Emirates conglomerates with more than 20 active companies having diversified interests in different countries spanning across  healthcare, hospitality, real estate investment  property development, as well as construction.

General

The construction company Admiral Contracting (previously Omran Contracting) was founded in 1974 by Mohammed Al-omran a leading Emiratee businessman as one of the early construction company in the UAE and was acquired by Mohammed Rahif Hakmi in 2001.

Dr Hakmi expanded  the business which has become one of the major enterprise worldwide investing in different sectors portfolios which  include  Real Estate Development, Information Technology, Marine, Health Care and Hospitality. The company has ongoing projects in Europe, Turkey, Comoros and the Middle East.

Companies

 Armada Property Services
 Admiral General Contracting
 Armada Hospital
 Armada Medical Center
 Armada One Day Surgical Center
 Armada Women Center and Spa
 Armada Pharmacy
 Armada Bluebay Hotel
 Admiral Real Estate
 Admiral Real Estate Investment
 Armada Holding STI
 Armada Blue Turizm Otel Ticaret Limited Şirketi
 Armada Emlak Limited Şirketi
 Armada Yatirim İnsaat Limited Şirketi
 Armada Ticaret Merkezi Turizm İnsaat Limited Şirketi
 Prestige Facility Management
 Armada Living - Holiday Homes
 Admiral Marine
 Armada Infotech DMCC
 Admiral Holding
 Ernest Holding

Selected completed projects

 Armada Towers
 Salam Tower, 50 stories building in Sharjah
 Office Building at Dubai Internet City phase A Dubai
 Warehousing Unit At Dubai Investment Park Dubai
 Armada 4 star Hotel at Armada Towers, Dubai
 Design and Build of Armada Hospital
 Armada Grannos Thermal 5 star Hotel and Convention center, Ankara

Current projects

 5 Star hotel at King Faisal road, Sharjah
 Residential Building at Jumeirah Village Triangle, Dubai
 5 Star hotel at Dubai Internet City phase A Dubai
 World Trade Center Trabzon
 Arakli Project
 Armada Resorts at Mitsamiouli in Comoros

External links
Armada Holding Website
Armada Bluebay Hotel Website 
Armada Medical Website
Armada Women Medical Spa Website
Admiral Marine Website
Armada Living Website
Armada Pharmacy facebook
Dr Hakmi Website
Armada Infotech Website
Armada Grannos Website

References

Holding companies of the United Arab Emirates
Health care companies of the United Arab Emirates
Hospitality companies of the United Arab Emirates
Property companies of the United Arab Emirates
Holding companies established in 1974
Emirati brands
Emirati companies established in 1974